Michael P. Burgess is an Australian intelligence official, and the current Director-General of Security in charge of the Australian Security Intelligence Organisation (ASIO). Prior to his appointment to this role on 16 September 2019, Burgess was director-general of the Australian Signals Directorate (ASD).

Early life
Burgess was born in England, and immigrated to Adelaide, South Australia in 1973 at the age of seven. He was the first member of his family to study in higher education, receiving a degree in electrical engineering from the South Australian Institute of Technology in 1988.

Intelligence career
Burgess joined ASD (then called the Defence Signals Directorate) in 1995, and worked there for 18 years, most notably as Deputy Director for Cyber and Information Security, before leaving to work in the private sector. Working in the private sector, Burgess served as the Chief Information Security Officer at Telstra, before finding work as a cyber-security consultant and advisor. He also served on the Federal Government’s Naval Shipbuilding Advisory Board. In December 2017, he returned to ASD as Director-General. In August 2019, prime minister Scott Morrison and Minister for Home Affairs Peter Dutton announced Burgess had been appointed to replace the retiring Duncan Lewis as the head of ASIO.

In February 2022 Burgess announced that ASIO had foiled a plot by foreign interference that involved an attempt by a foreign government to install political candidates in the lead-up to the coming national election in Australia.

References

1960s births
Living people
Directors-General of Security
Australian public servants
University of South Australia alumni
English emigrants to Australia